Proper behavior (or Proper ethical behavior) precedes the Torah (Hebrew: דרך ארץ קדמה לתורה) is a Jewish saying based on a passage from the Chazal found in the Midrash (Leviticus Rabbah 9:3), one of the important interpretations of which is that before one can learn and put into practice the mitzvot of the Torah, he or she must pave the path with Derech Eretz, meaning decent behavior, good personality traits, and suchlike.
See Torah im Derech Eretz #Appropriate behaviour and good character.

Origins and interpretations
The text in Leviticus Rabbah (known in Hebrew as Vayikra Rabbah) comes to show that in human history, proper behavior preceded the Torah, as written:

The Torah was not given during the earliest years of humanity because it was first necessary to have proper preparation in terms of values. This leads to the conclusion that advances in Torah knowledge must never weaken natural morality.

In this view, the Torah was given with a background of the moral development that preceded it, with the goal of lifting mankind up to a higher moral level. It comes to say, in a way, that a lack to reach the level for which the Torah is aiming is not a moral lack – the nations of the world are required to be ethical, even though they are not required according to Jewish tradition to observe the mitzvot.

In Pirkei Avot (3:17) the sages declared, "If there is no Derech Eretz there is no Torah, and if there is no Torah there is no Derech Eretz." That is, proper moral behavior must precede the Torah, but after the Torah has been revealed based on the prior existence of proper behavior, a new and higher-level moral code is derived from the Torah.

Some explain that the Torah itself does not immediately present all of the mitzvot and their details, since the Book of Bereshit deals almost exclusively with the ethical behavior of Avraham, Yitzchak and Yaakov without explicitly mentioning mitzvot. This may teach us that proper 
character traits, especially those related to relationships between people, takes precedence over the religious mandates of the Torah.

Another interpretation is that the Torah devotes its entire first book to stories of the forefathers and foremothers, to be used as models for decent behavior, and after having absorbed those, one is ready to go on to the laws and precepts of Jewish life. The lives of the forefathers and foremothers are the examples after which people must pattern their lives in order to become suitable vessels for receiving and internalizing the Torah.

See also
 Torah im Derech Eretz
 Derekh Eretz Rabbah
 Derekh Eretz Zutta

External links
 Quote of the Day: "decent behavior precedes Torah" on Blogger
 Parshas Bereishis 5759

References

Jewish ethical law
Talmud concepts and terminology